High Jump is a low budget 1959 British crime film.

Plot
A former trapeze artist becomes involved in a jewel robbery.

Cast
Bill Ryan - 	Richard Wyler
Jackie - 	Lisa Daniely
Kitty - 	 Leigh Madison
Ray Shaw - 	 Michael Peake
Tom Rowton - 	Arnold Bell
Mrs. Barlow - 	Nora Gordon
Tony - 	 Stuart Hillier
Frank - 	 Tony Doonan
Inspector - 	Robert Raglan
Guard - 	Colin Tapley

Critical reception
TV Guide wrote, "blase attempt to create an exciting crime drama quickly loses much impact in the opening scenes...The addition of a sex angle did absolutely nothing to heighten interest."

References

External links

Category:British crime films

1959 films
British crime films
British black-and-white films
Films shot at New Elstree Studios
1950s English-language films
1950s British films